{{Infobox comics creator
| name          = Loustal
| image         = LoustalLM2015.jpg
| imagesize     = 
| caption       = Loustal in 2015.
| birth_name    = Jacques de Loustal
| birth_date    =  
| birth_place   =  Neuilly-Sur-Seine, France
| death_date    = 
| death_place   = 
| nationality   = French
| area          = artist, writer, colourist
| alias         = 
| notable works = New York Miami  Clichés d'Amour  Barney and the Blue Note  The Boys of Sheriff Street ("Les Frères Adamov")
| awards        = 
}}
Jacques de Loustal (born 10 April 1956) is a French comics artist who uses a painterly style reminiscent of David Hockney.

Biography
In combination with a career as an illustrator, Loustal began working in comics in the late 1970s publishing short comics in the Franco-Belgian comics magazines Métal Hurlant, Pilote, Nitro, Chic, Zoulou as well as newspapers such as Libération, usually working with writer . In 1984 Loustal became a frequent contributor to the monthly À Suivre magazine, for which he created Coeurs de Sable, Barney et la Note Bleue, Un Jeune Homme Romantique and Kid Congo.

Partial bibliography

 Arrière saison Viviane, Simone et les autres Zenata plage Carnet de voyages Ce qu'il attendait d'elle Ciné-Romans Touriste de bananes (after text by Georges Simenon)
 Insolite La Nuit de l'alligator Une vespa, des lunettes noires, une palm beach, elles voudraient en plus que j'ai de la conversation.Barney et la note bleue with Philippe ParingauxCœurs de sable with Philippe ParingauxNew-York Miami with Philippe ParingauxLe Sang des voyous with Philippe ParingauxKid Congo with Philippe ParingauxClichés d'amour with Philippe ParingauxLa Couleur des rêves with Philippe ParingauxSoleils de nuit with Philippe ParingauxUn garçon romantique with Philippe Paringaux

English booksThe Boys of Sheriff Street with Philippe Paringaux - 2016What he expected of her - 2002Java in the Shadow of Merapi with Jean-Luc Coatalem - 1996New York, Miami with Philippe Paringaux - 1990Barney and the Blue Note with Philippe Paringaux - 1988Love Shots with Philippe Paringaux - 1988Hearts of Sand'' with Philippe Paringaux - 1985

Notes

References

 Loustal publications in (A SUIVRE), Métal Hurlant, Pilote BDoubliées 
 Loustal albums Bedetheque

External links
 Loustal official site 
 Loustal international site 
 Loustal biography on Lambiek Comiclopedia
 Archive Loustal site 1998 - 2013 

1956 births
Living people
People from Neuilly-sur-Seine
French comics artists
The New Yorker people